Elya Wako is a South Sudanese professional football manager. His biggest win with South Sudan was against Djibouti on March 28, 2017 in Juba. He led South Sudan to win 6-0 against Djibouti.

Career
Since May 2014, Wako has coached the South Sudan national football team.

References

Living people
South Sudanese football managers
South Sudan national football team managers
Place of birth missing (living people)
1970 births